Youssef El Kachati (born 30 November 1999) is a Dutch-born Moroccan football player. He plays in Netherlands for Sparta Rotterdam and their youth team.

Club career
After originally joining Sparta Rotterdam youth team in 2016, he signed a 1.5-year professional contract with Sparta on 16 December 2018.

He made his Eerste Divisie debut for Sparta Rotterdam on 30 November 2018 in a game against Helmond Sport as a starter.

International career
El Kachati debuted for the Morocco U23s in a 2-0 2019 Africa U-23 Cup of Nations qualification loss to the DR Congo U23s on 20 March 2019.

References

External links
 

1999 births
Footballers from Leiden
Moroccan footballers
Morocco youth international footballers
Dutch footballers
Dutch sportspeople of Moroccan descent
Living people
Association football forwards
Sparta Rotterdam players
Eerste Divisie players
Tweede Divisie players